The soundtrack for the 2021 American superhero film Venom: Let There Be Carnage directed by Andy Serkis, featuring the Marvel Comics character Venom, the second in Sony's Spider-Man Universe and the sequel to Venom (2018), features an original score composed by Marco Beltrami and a series of songs in the film. After previously writing a single for the first film, Eminem was revealed to write the song "Last One Standing", in collaboration with Skylar Grey, Polo G, and Mozzy. The single was released on September 30, 2021.

Beltrami's score was released as Venom: Let There Be Carnage (Original Motion Picture Soundtrack) by Sony Classical Records in digital formats on October 1, 2021, in conjunction with the film's release. It later saw a physical release on October 15, followed by a vinyl edition released on November 5. Beltrami claimed it as an "opportunity to stretch the compositional wings" using an ensemble orchestra to cover a lot of emotional directions, ranging from "fun buddy-themes", "gothic horror" and a "twisted love story".

Development 

Marco Beltrami was hired to compose the film's music, in his first Spider-Man film, and fourth film based on Marvel Comics after The Wolverine (2013), Fantastic Four (2015) and Logan (2017). He met Serkis in a virtual meeting due to COVID-19 pandemic restrictions and discussed about how utilising the fun element in the film and not to overdo it, so as it becomes "goofy" and to maintain a right balance. He decided not to interpret Ludwig Göransson's score for the predecessor and to write new themes from scratch. He wrote several themes for the film, which includes separate themes for Venom and Eddie Brock and a buddy theme for them, a separate theme for Carnage and a theme for the love story.

Due to the COVID-19 pandemic, musicians had to record the separately which felt it as "little challenging". The electronic music had created very early in the process, which had woodwinds and brass sections. For Carnage, he worked with "creating feedback to build on that part of his character" and subsequently wrote the orchestral music in conjunction. For the Cletus story, he tuned the woodwind instruments. He wanted the theme for Venom to be "pretty recognizable" that "distills the visceral response that we get watching the character. It’s a very simple theme, it’s just two notes followed by three notes so it’s easy to plug it in. People will be able to recognize that it’s Venom’s theme."

Beltrami felt the "cathedral fight" was a complex sequence for him scoring the film, as it was created during the storyboard but the effects were done before he was hired to score the film. He said "In the battle when one character starts beating the other, the music needs to acknowledge that. That’s really challenging because it was hard knowing what we were doing moment to moment. The sequence is very important musically because all the themes really come together in that sequence [...] So, that probably took the longest to do. We would start sketching a version of it and as the picture became more developed we would refine the music. You don’t just write the cue and turn it in, it evolves with the picture."

Track listing

Reception 
Zanobard Reviews gave a 6/10 to the score and said "Marco Beltrami’s score for Venom: Let There Be Carnage is a great deal better than the score for the first film, but (at least for me) it still leaves a fair bit to be desired. There are some well-crafted themes here (take Eddie and Venom’s, for example), but while they do get a fair bit of album time they just don’t really feel all that memorable, nor particularly impactful on the score as a whole. Bar a couple of heroic renditions near the end, the themes don’t really do all that much. Carnage’s theme is also much less identifiable that the ones for the protagonists (being more murky atmosphere than tangible motif) which is a bit of a shame too. The action music as well, while enjoyable in parts, is also just kind of unremarkable. The orchestral style is there and the instrumentation sounds good, but… it just doesn’t stick with you." Music critic Jonathan Broxton said "The themes are strong and memorable, the creepy drama inherent in the love theme gives the relationship between Cletus and Shriek a sense of doomed tragedy, and the action music is vibrant and intense and intricate, especially in the church-set finale. Furthermore, the stylistic throwbacks to Beltrami’s late 1990s heyday remind us why many of us fell in love with his music in the first place."

Filmtracks.com wrote "Venom: Let There Be Carnage suffers from an overabundance of themes and little satisfying narrative in which they can thrive. The listener thus must pull out highlights, such as the remarkably smart and affable "Venom and Blues," for appreciation apart from the picture. The film's mid-credits scene with Spider-Man uses pieces of music from the rest of score rather an original cue written by Beltrami. There is much to like about this score, and it's certainly an improvement over its predecessor, but don't expect it to overwhelm you with a memorable presence." Soundtrack World critic Anton Smit said "While most of the music is supportive and not very pleasant to hear on its own, Beltrami did also come up with some interesting ideas."

Personnel 
Credits adapted from CD liner notes.

 Music – Marco Beltrami
 Additional music – Marcus Trumpp, Miles Hankins
 Production and sound design – Buck Sanders
 Digital score recordist – Vincent Cirilli
 Recording – Adam Michalak
 Mixing – Tyson Lozensky
 Music editing – Jim Schultz
 Music coordinator – Encompass Music Partners
 Copyist – Joann Kane Music Service
 Music business and legal affairs – Mark Cavell
 Product manager – Klara Korytowska
 Liner Notes – Andy Serkis
 Design – Bosslogic
 Instruments
 Bass – Geoffrey Osika, Michael Valerio, Steve Dress, Nico Abondolo
 Bassoon – Anthony Parnther, Rose Corrigan
 Cello – Dennis Karmazyn, Eric Byers, Evgeny Tonkha, Jacob Braun, Paula Hochhalter, Steve Erdody
 Clarinet – Daniel Higgins, Stuart Clark
 Drums – Haydan Beltrami
 Flute – Heather Clark, Sara Andon
 French horn – Allen Fogle, Dylan Hart, Katelyn Faraudo, Laura Brenes, Teag Reaves, Dave Everson
 Guitar – Buck Sanders, Tristan Beltrami
 Electric bass – Tristan Beltrami
 Harp – Marcia Dickstein
 Oboe – Lara Wickes
 Percussion – Ted Atkatz, Mbgordy, Pete Korpela, Wade Culbreath, Greg Goodall
 Piano – Hsin-I Huang
 Timpani – Greg Goodall
 Trumpet, trombone – Barry Perkins, Robert Schaer, Tom Hooten, Jon Lewis
 Tuba – Doug Tornquist
 Viola – Alma Fernandez, Andrew Duckles, David Walther, Zach Dellinger*, Meredith Crawford, Shawn Mann, Victor De Almeida, Rob Brophy
 Violin – Amy Hershberger, Ana Lan Daue, Benjamin Jacobson, Charlie Bisharat, Darius Campo, Dennis Kim, Eun-Mee Ahn, Helen Nightengale, Jessica Guideri, Luanne Homzy, Lucia Micarelli, Maya Magub, Minyoung Chang, Phillip Levy, Roger Wilkie, Sandra Cameron, Sara Parkins, Shalini Vijayan, Steven Zander, Tamara Hatwan, Alyssa Park
 Orchestra
 Orchestration – Dana Niu, Ed Trybek, Henri Wilkinson, Jonathan Beard, Mark Graham, Pete Anthony, Richard Bronskill, Rossano Galante
 Concertmaster – Tereza Stanislav
 Conductor – Pete Anthony
 Contractor – Jasper Randall, Peter Rotter

References 

2021 soundtrack albums
Marvel Comics film soundtracks
Sony Classical Records soundtracks
Spider-Man film soundtracks
Venom (film series)